Lance Sergeant Thomas Kenny VC (4 April 1882 − 29 November 1948) was a British Army soldier and an English recipient of the Victoria Cross (VC), the highest award for gallantry in the face of the enemy given to British and Commonwealth forces.

On 4 November 1915 near La Houssoie, France, 33-year-old Kenny performed an act of bravery for which he was awarded the Victoria Cross.

Biography
He was a private in the 13th Battalion, The Durham Light Infantry, British Army during the First World War when the following deed took place for which he was awarded the VC.

In thick mist, an officer in charge of a patrol was shot through both thighs. Private Kenny, although repeatedly fired on by the enemy, crawled about for more than an hour with his wounded officer on his back, trying to find his way through the fog to the British trenches. He refused to leave the officer although told several times to do so, and at last, utterly exhausted, left him in a comparatively safe ditch and went for help. He found a rescue party and guided them to the wounded officer who was then brought to safety.

The officer Lt. Philip Brown later died of his wounds.

References

Monuments to Courage (David Harvey, 1999)
The Register of the Victoria Cross (This England, 1997)
VCs of the First World War - The Western Front 1915 (Peter F. Batchelor & Christopher Matson, 1999)
held privately by his grandson

External links
 Location of grave and VC medal (Co. Durham)
 DLI Biography
 
 Durham County Council on-line exhibition

1882 births
1948 deaths
Burials in County Durham
People from Wingate, County Durham
Durham Light Infantry soldiers
British World War I recipients of the Victoria Cross
British Army personnel of World War I
English miners
British Army recipients of the Victoria Cross
Military personnel from County Durham